Franziskus von Paula Graf von Schönborn (24 January 1844 – 25 June 1899) was a Czech Roman Catholic cardinal. Born at Prague, he was 5th Bishop of České Budějovice (1883–1885) and 28th Archbishop of Prague (from 1885), and was created Cardinal-Priest of Santi Giovanni e Paolo in 1889.

He was a son of Erwein Damian Hugo, Count of Schönborn (1812–1881) and Christina Maria Josefa Countess von Brühl (1817–1902).

References

External links
Catholic-hierarchy.org entry for Franziskus von Paula Schönborn 

1844 births
1899 deaths
Czech cardinals
Roman Catholic archbishops of Prague
Bishops of České Budějovice
19th-century Roman Catholic bishops in Austria-Hungary
Franziskus
Cardinals created by Pope Leo XIII